Robert Newhard (April 28, 1884 – May 20, 1945), also known as Robert S. Newhard, Robert Newhardt, or Robert Newhart, was an American cinematographer.
 
He was born in Pennsylvania's third-largest city, Allentown and died in Los Angeles.

Filmography

 The Bargain (1914)
 Two-Gun Hicks (1914)
 On the Night Stage (1915)
 The Coward (1915/I)
 The Iron Strain (1915)
 Civilization (1916)
 Where Love Leads (1916)
 The Iced Bullet (1917)
 The Crab (1917)
 Back of the Man (1917)
 Sweetheart of the Doomed (1917)
 Happiness (1917)
 Golden Rule Kate (1917)
 Carmen of the Klondike (1918)
 With Hoops of Steel (1918)
 Social Ambition (1918)
 His Birthright (1918)
 When Do We Eat? (1918)
 Fuss and Feathers (1918)
 A Man in the Open (1919)
 Happy Though Married (1919)
 Diane of the Green Van (1919)
 A Man's Country (1919)
 A Man's Fight (1919)
 The Street Called Straight (1920)
 Smoldering Embers (1920)
 Dollar for Dollar (1920)
 Everybody's Sweetheart (1920)
 Nobody's Kid (1921)
 Making the Grade (1921)
 Trail of the Axe (1922)
 Hungry Hearts (1922)
 Crimson Gold (1923)
 The Hunchback of Notre Dame (1923)
 Trail of the North Wind (1924)
 The Sporting Lover (1926)
 White Water (1926)
 Rubber Tires (1927)
 Lure of the Night Club (1927)
 Party Girl (1930)

External links

as Robert Newhard at American Film Institute Catalog
as Robert S. Newhard at American Film Institute Catalog
as Robert Newhardt at American Film Institute Catalog

1884 births
1945 deaths
American cinematographers
Artists from Allentown, Pennsylvania